Cook Islands participated in the 2010 Summer Youth Olympics in Singapore.

The Cook Islands squad consisted of 18 athletes competing in 3 sports: aquatics (swimming), handball and sailing.

Handball

Sailing

One Person Dinghy

Swimming

References

2010 in Cook Islands sport
Nations at the 2010 Summer Youth Olympics
Cook Islands at the Youth Olympics